Edward L. Kweller (January 27, 1915 – April 1, 2003) was an American professional basketball player. He played college basketball for Duquesne University. Kweller then played in the National Basketball League for two years for the Pittsburgh Pirates and averaged 2.6 points per game. In the 1938–39 season, he also played in the American Basketball League for the Washington Heurichs. Kweller later sold furniture for a living and moved to California to retire.

References

1915 births
2003 deaths
American Basketball League (1925–1955) players
American men's basketball players
Basketball players from Pittsburgh
Centers (basketball)
Duquesne Dukes men's basketball players
Jewish men's basketball players
Pittsburgh Pirates (NBL) players
Basketball players from Los Angeles